The Vefsnfjord or Vefsnfjorden is a fjord in the Helgeland traditional district of Nordland county, Norway. The fjord flows through the municipalities of Alstahaug, Leirfjord, and Vefsn. 

The fjord begins at Tjøtta, south of the island of Alsten and meets the Leirfjord at the island of Sundøy before turning to the south as it proceeds inland to the town of Mosjøen. The outer part of the fjord is also called Sørfjord.

Several large rivers run into the Vefsnfjord, including the Vefsna, Fusta, and Drevja. All three of the rivers are traditionally excellent salmon fishing rivers, although they now have been infected with the salmon parasite Gyrodactylus salaris.

A German prisoner ship was sunk here by British Aircraft during World War II with major loss of life. A memorial is located on a nearby island.

Media gallery

See also
 List of Norwegian fjords

References

Fjords of Nordland
Alstahaug
Leirfjord
Vefsn